(OFähnr or OFR) designates in the Heer of the Bundeswehr a military person or member of the armed forces with the last or highest Officer Aspirant rank.

It is also grouped as OR-7 in NATO, equivalent to Sergeant 1st Class, Master Sergeant, or Chief Petty Officer in the US Armed forces, and to Warrant Officer Class 2 in the British Army and Royal Navy.

In navy context NCOs of this rank were formally addressed as  also informally / short .

The sequence of ranks (top-down approach) in that particular group is as follows:
OR-9: 
OR-8: 
OFD:  and  /  and 
OR-6a:  / 
OR-6b:  and  /  and

See also 
 Rank insignia of the German Bundeswehr

References 

Military ranks of Germany